Don or Donald Shipley may refer to:

Don Shipley (stage director), Canadian stage director
Don Shipley (Navy SEAL), Virginia, SEAL trainer for civilians